Nestotus stenophyllus is a species of flowering plant in the family Asteraceae known by the common name narrowleaf mock goldenweed. It is native to the western United States, especially the inland Pacific Northwest and northern Great Basin, where it grows in sagebrush habitat. It is a small, clump-forming perennial herb growing up to about 12 centimeters tall. The rough-haired, glandular leaves are 1 or 2 centimeters long and linear to lance-shaped. The inflorescence is a solitary flower head atop an erect peduncle. The hairy head has several yellow disc florets each around a centimeter long and at the center many yellow disc florets. The fruit is a silky-haired achene tipped with a white pappus.

External links

Jepson Manual Treatment
USDA Plants Profile
Flora of North America
Washington Burke Museum
Photo gallery

Astereae
Flora of the Western United States
Flora without expected TNC conservation status